BBC Sessions is a compilation album featuring studio sessions and a live concert recorded by English rock group Led Zeppelin for the BBC. It was released on 11 November 1997, by Atlantic Records. Disc one consists of material from four different 1969 BBC sessions. Disc two contains most of the 1 April 1971 concert from the Paris Theatre in London. Disc three was only included in a limited run of album releases and features rare interviews from 1969, 1976/1977, and 1990.

Countless bootlegs of these recordings circulated for years before the official release. This release was widely welcomed by Led Zeppelin fans as it was the first live release since The Song Remains the Same in 1976. Others have criticized the decision to edit some of the songs and drop others that were recorded for the BBC. Most notable are one session from 1969 which included the unreleased song "Sunshine Woman", and about seven minutes of the "Whole Lotta Love" medley from 1971. The album was re-released in September 2016 as The Complete BBC Sessions with further BBC recordings, including the "Sunshine Woman" session.



Track listing

Standard edition

The Complete Sessions edition – bonus disc 
Nine recordings from a conglomerate of 1969 sessions, including "Dazed and Confused", "I Can't Quit You Baby", "You Shook Me" and "Sunshine Woman" along with two versions of both "Communication Breakdown" and "What Is and What Should Never Be" (recorded two years apart) were released on 16 September 2016, comprising a third disc of the previously two-disc BBC Sessions compilation. Eight of the nine songs were previously unreleased; "White Summer" was previously released in 1990 on the Led Zeppelin Boxed Set and the expanded 1993 reissue of Coda from The Complete Studio Recordings and  Led Zeppelin Definitive Collection (2008) box sets. The lost March 1969 three-song session – by all accounts erased from its master tapes – appears on the disc sourced from a reputed AM radio recording. This session contains the oft-bootlegged, boogieing blues rocker "Sunshine Woman," a track that Zeppelin never formally released previously, and renditions of Willie Dixon's "I Can't Quit You Baby" and "You Shook Me."

Recording information 
 Session one
 John Peel's Top Gear
 Venue: Playhouse Theatre, Northumberland Avenue, London
 Recording date: Monday 3 March 1969
 Original broadcast: Sunday 23 March 1969 (in a show with sessions from Free, the Moody Blues and Deep Purple)
 Tracks: "Communication Breakdown" (disc 3, track 1), "Dazed and Confused" (disc 1, track 4), "You Shook Me" (disc 1, track 1), "I Can't Quit You Baby" (disc 1, track 2).
 Producer: Bernie Andrews
 Engineer: Pete Ritzema
 Tape operator: Bob Conduct

 Session two
 Alexis Korner's Rhythm and Blues, (BBC World Service)
 Venue: Maida Vale Studio 4, Delaware Road, London
 Recording date: Wednesday 19 March 1969
 Original broadcast: Monday 14 April 1969
 Tracks: "Sunshine Woman" (disc 3, track 9), "I Can't Quit You Baby" (disc 3, track 7), "You Shook Me" (disc 3, track 8). The session was wiped or lost by the BBC, although recordings survive on bootlegs. The show was re-run later in 1969, adding the recording of "What Is And What Should Never Be" from the June 16 session.
 Producer: Jeff Griffin

 Session three
 Chris Grant's Tasty Pop Sundae (originally commissioned for Dave Symond's Symonds On Sunday show)
 Venue: Aeolian Hall Studio 2, Bond Street, London
 Recording Date: Monday 16 June 1969
 Original Broadcast: Sunday 22 June 1969
 Tracks: "The Girl I Love She Got Long Black Wavy Hair" (disc 1, track 5), "Communication Breakdown" (disc 1, track 3), "Somethin' Else" (disc 1, track 10), "What Is and What Should Never Be" (disc 3, track 2).
 Producer: Paul Williams

 Session four
 John Peel's Top Gear (Double recording session)
 Venue: Maida Vale Studio 4, Delaware Road, London
 Recording date: Tuesday 24 June 1969
 Original broadcast: Sunday 29 June 1969
 Tracks: "Whole Lotta Love" (disc 1, track 9), "Communication Breakdown" (disc 1, track 7), "What Is and What Should Never Be" (disc 1, track 6), "Travelling Riverside Blues" (disc 1, track 8). "Travelling Riverside Blues" had previously been released on the Led Zeppelin box set and expanded versions of Coda.
 Producer: John Walters
 Engineer: Tony Wilson

 Session five
 One Night Stand
 Venue: Playhouse Theatre
 Recording date: Friday 27 June 1969
 Original broadcast: Sunday 10 August 1969
 Tracks: "Communication Breakdown" (disc 1, track 11), "I Can't Quit You Baby" (disc 1, track 12), "Dazed and Confused" (disc 3, track 3), "White Summer" (disc 3, track 4), "You Shook Me" (disc 1, track 13), "How Many More Times" (disc 1, track 14). "White Summer" had previously been released as "White Summer/Black Mountain Side" on the Led Zeppelin box set and expanded versions of Coda, but with 15 seconds cut out.

 Session six
 In Concert (Emcee John Peel)
 Venue: Paris Theatre, Lower Regent Street, London
 Recording date: Thursday 1 April 1971
 Original broadcast: Sunday 4 April 1971
 Tracks: "Immigrant Song", "Heartbreaker", "Since I've Been Loving You", "Black Dog", "Dazed and Confused", "Stairway to Heaven", "Going to California", "That's the Way" (disc 2, tracks 1–8), "What Is and What Should Never Be" (disc 3, track 5), "Whole Lotta Love" (medley, disc 2, track 9), "Thank You" (disc 2, track 10), "Communication Breakdown" (disc 3, track 6). The "Whole Lotta Love" medley has had "For What It's Worth", "Trucking Little Mama" and "Honey Bee" edited out, shortening the medley by seven minutes.
 Producer: Jeff Griffin
 Engineer: Tony Wilson

Personnel 
Led Zeppelin
 John Bonhamdrums, percussion, backing vocals
 John Paul Jonesbass guitar, bass pedals, keyboards, mandolin, backing vocals
 Jimmy Pageacoustic and electric guitars, backing vocals, mastering, production
 Robert Plantvocals, harmonica
Additional personnel
 Andie Airfixart direction, design
 Jon Astleymastering
 John Davis – mastering (The Complete BBC Sessions 2016 reissue)
 Luis Reyliner notes
 Chris Walterphotography

Chart positions

Certifications

Release history

References

External links 

 Ledzeppelin.com BBC Sessions 
 The Garden Tapes – analysis of live tracks edits for the album

Albums produced by Jimmy Page
BBC Radio recordings
Led Zeppelin compilation albums
Led Zeppelin live albums
1997 live albums
1997 compilation albums
Atlantic Records live albums
Atlantic Records compilation albums
Folk rock compilation albums
Live folk rock albums